7352 Hypsenor, provisional designation: , is a larger Jupiter trojan from the Trojan camp, approximately  in diameter. The tumbling Jovian asteroid is a slow rotator with an exceptionally long rotation period of 648 hours. It was discovered on 4 February 1994 by Japanese astronomers Seiji Ueda and Hiroshi Kaneda at the Kushiro Observatory on Hokkaidō, Japan. It was numbered in December 1996, and named after the Trojan warrior Hypsenor from Greek mythology in November 2021.

Classification and orbit 

Hypsenor is a Jupiter trojan in a 1:1 orbital resonance with Jupiter. It is located in the trailering Trojan camp at the Gas Giant's  Lagrangian point, 60° behind its orbit . It is also a non-family asteroid of the Jovian background population.

It orbits the Sun at a distance of 4.9–5.3 AU once every 11 years and 8 months (4,247 days; semi-major axis of 5.13 AU). Its orbit has an eccentricity of 0.04 and an inclination of 8° with respect to the ecliptic. The body's observation arc begins with a precovery taken at the Palomar Observatory in August 1988, more than 5 years prior to its official discovery observation at Kushiro.

Numbering and naming 

This minor planet was numbered by the Minor Planet Center on 24 December 1996. On 29 November 2021, IAU's Working Group Small Body Nomenclature  it from Greek mythology after the warrior Hypsenor, who was killed during the Trojan War by the Trojan prince Deiphobus whose Javelin throw bounced back of Idomeneus shield.

Physical characteristics 

In the SDSS-based taxonomy, Hypsenor is classified as an X/L-type. This is unusual as most Jupiter trojans are D-types, with the reminder being mostly C- and P-type asteroids. It has a V–I color index of 0.85.

Rotation period 

In October 2013, a rotational lightcurve was obtained for this asteroid from photometric observations by American amateur astronomer Robert Stephens at the Trojan Station  of the Center for Solar System Studies in Landers, California. It gave a well-defined, outstandingly long rotation period of  hours with a brightness variation of 0.30 magnitude. As of 2018, there are only about three dozens known slow rotators with periods longer than that of Hypsenor.

Tumbler 

The astronomers also detected a non-principal axis rotation seen in distinct rotational cycles in successive order. This is commonly known as tumbling. Hypsenor is the six-largest asteroid and the second-largest Jupiter trojan after 4902 Thessandrus known to be is such a state (also see list of tumblers).

Diameter and albedo 

According to the space-based surveys carried out by the Japanese Akari satellite and the NEOWISE mission of NASA's Wide-field Infrared Survey Explorer, Hypsenor measures 47.07 and 47.73 kilometers in diameter and its surface has an albedo of 0.207 and 0.093, respectively. The Collaborative Asteroid Lightcurve Link assumes a standard albedo for a carbonaceous asteroid of 0.057 and calculates a larger diameter of 55.67 kilometers, based on an absolute magnitude of 10.0.

Notes

References

External links 
 Asteroid Lightcurve Database (LCDB), query form (info )
 Discovery Circumstances: Numbered Minor Planets (5001)-(10000) – Minor Planet Center
 
 

007352
Discoveries by Hiroshi Kaneda
Discoveries by Seiji Ueda
Named minor planets
007352
19940204